Amelia "Mildred" Milka Sablich (born 11 Jun 1908 in Trinidad, Colorado, died October 7, 1994, in Helper, Utah) also known as Flaming Milka, was 19 years old when she became a leader in the 1927 coal strike in that state.  Her family emigrated to Trinidad from Volosko, Croatia, (then part of the Austro-Hungarian Empire) in 1907. Her father, Anton Sablich, worked as a coal miner in Colorado.

Life
Sablich became a familiar personality throughout the United States during the months of November and December 1927.  The strike in Colorado was conducted by the Industrial Workers of the World; she took an active part in it, speaking out for the cause of the miners. She wore bright red and engaged in physical fights with men (including a mine guard).  Her older sister, Santa Benash, was also heavily involved in the strike.

Union organizers were locked up and/or deported whenever they could be identified; thus Sablich and other women took over the responsibility for organizing the strike.

Milka spent approximately five weeks in jail spread over at least two occasions. According to the Denver Morning Post, at one point Milka was offered her freedom if she promised not to attend any more meetings of the strikers. She refused to accept such a requirement, and she was kept in jail.

The 1927 coal strike in Colorado is best remembered as the strike in which the "first Columbine Massacre" occurred.

After the massacre and Milka's release, she toured the country giving speeches to raise money for the miners. When the strike was concluded, she enrolled in Work People's College in Duluth, Minnesota.

See also
Anti-union violence

References

 "Girl Injured by Mine Guard in Rioting". Waukesha Freeman. October 28, 1927.
 Flaming' Milka, Girl Strike Leader, Enters Duluth School". Duluth News-Tribune February 22, 1928.
 "1907 Immigration Record for Sablich Family". from Ellis Island ship manifests.

External links
 "Flaming Milka". Rebel Graphics.
 "Slaughter in Serene". Rebel Graphics.
 "Wobbling". Time magazine, December 5, 1927.

Further reading
 Slaughter in Serene: the Columbine Coal Strike Reader by Eric Margolis, Joanna Sampson, Phil Goodstein, and Richard Myers (Published by the Industrial Workers of the World)
 Break Their Haughty Power, Joe Murphy in the Heyday of the Wobblies a non-fiction novel by Eugene Nelson, chapters 33-34 (Published (c) 1993 by "ism press, inc")

1908 births
1994 deaths
People from Trinidad, Colorado
Industrial Workers of the World members
American people of Croatian descent